Shai Efrati (born 1971) is a physician from Israel and an  associate professor at the Sackler Faculty of Medicine and the Sagol School of Neuroscience at Tel Aviv University as well as director of the Sagol Center for Hyperbaric Medicine and Research at the Yitzhak Shamir Medical Center in Israel. As of 2008, Efrati has served as chairman of the Israeli Society for Diving and Hyperbaric Medicine. Efrati is also Co-Founder and Chair of Medical Advisory Board for Aviv Scientific.

Education and career 
Efrati completed his M.D. at Ben Gurion University between 1994 and 2000. He later completed his residency, specializing in internal medicine, between 2001 and 2004, with the Department of Internal Medicine of Yitzhak Shamir Medical Center. In 2003, he continued his training in diving and hyperbaric medicine at the Israel Naval institute in Haifa. He specialized in nephrology. From 2005 to 2007 he was the head of the Nephrology Division and the Head of Research and Development unit at Yitzhak Shamir Medical Center since 2015.

Efrati is co-founder and Scientific Director of Hospitech Respiration Ltd., founded in 2006 and based in Israel. The company engages in the development of respiratory tract management devices for mechanically ventilated patients. It is based on the AnapnoGuard system, a continuous closed loop control system that prevents complications related to prolonged mechanical ventilation by continuously monitoring CO2 levels above the cuff and adjusting cuff pressure required to maintain the seal at appropriate pressure.

Efrati is co-founder and chair of the Medical Advisory Board to Aviv Scientific, which leverages Efrati's research on HBOT to improve brain and physical performance in healthy aging adults.

Research work 
In 2008, Efrati founded and now directs the Sagol Center for Hyperbaric Medicine and Research at Tel Aviv University and Yitzhak Shamir Medical Center, where he oversees and collaborates with other scientists and manages a large hyperbaric medicine and research facility. The center currently treats up to 200 patients per day.

Efrati has initiated a research program focusing on neuroplasticity and cognitive rehabilitation by the use of Hyperbaric Oxygen Therapy (HBOT). In the first clinical studies, it was proved that HBOT can induce neuroplasticity and improves neurocognitive functions in post stroke and Traumatic Brain Injury (TBI) years after the acute Insult. The clinical results gained from the research program have led to ongoing cooperation between a multidisciplinary team focused on the regenerative effects of hyperbaric oxygen in various brain injuries such as stroke, post-concussion syndrome (PCS), Traumatic Brain Injury, Alzheimer's disease as well with a special focus on age-related functional decline.

In his studies, it was demonstrated that HBOT can induce neuroplasticity and significant clinical improvement in patients with fibromyalgia who have a history of childhood sexual abuse.

In his recent study HBOT was shown to induce cognitive enhancements in healthy aging adults via mechanisms involving regional changes in Cerebral blood flow. The main improvements include attention, information processing speed and executive functions, which normally decline with aging.

In his latest study, on November 18, 2020, for the first time in humans, two key biological hallmarks of aging, telomere length shortening and accumulation of senescent cells, were shown to be reversed with Hyperbaric Oxygen Therapy (HBOT).

Selected papers

See also 

 Hyperbaric medicine
 Science and technology in Israel
 Health care in Israel

References

External links 
Academic profile: Tel Aviv University
Shai Efrati in the Sagol Center for Hyperbaric Medicine and Research

Israeli rehabilitation physicians
Ben-Gurion University of the Negev alumni
Academic staff of Tel Aviv University
1971 births
Living people
Israeli inventors